TransNational Payments is a private independent sales organization (ISO) headquartered in Rosemont, Illinois. TransNational provides credit card processing and electronic payment solutions for small to medium-sized businesses across a variety of industries.

History
Founded in 1999 as TransNational Bankcard, Inc. by John Pitzaferro, the company changed its name to TransNational Payments, Inc. to better reflect the services offered. The idea to create the company came to Pitzaferro after spending 16 years working in merchant services and witnessing the lack of transparency in the industry, which in many ways still exists today. Desiring to bridge the gap between payment processors and their customers, he focused on creating an organization that would advocate for merchants by using full-disclosure communication, encourage its employees through a healthy workplace culture and give back to local communities by participating in numerous charitable causes.

In 2009, Pitzaferro founded My Well Ministry, a service that provides payment processing support to churches, nonprofits and philanthropies at cost. The following year, he launched another initiative, called Party with a Purpose, an annual fundraiser co-sponsored by TransNational Payments and the ORPHANetwork to benefit vulnerable children in Nicaragua. Since its inaugural year in 2011, the event draws hundreds of attendees every October and has delivered nearly $1.2 million in donations designated to provide 1,200 children in the community of Nueva Vida, Nicaragua with food, medical care and education.

In 2014, the company partnered with Vision96 — an IT consulting service company. It operates in the field of telecommunications, unified communications, data & wide area network services, cloud & DCS and internet services.

Products
TransNational Payments supports a variety of payment products and services commonly used by merchants today, including ACH payments, credit card and debit card processing, gift card and loyalty programs, mobile payments, online payments, payment gateways, virtual terminals and point of sale systems. The sale, installation and customer service of all products is carried out by the company’s in-house team.

In March 2018, TransNational Payments unveiled its new payment gateway API, called Pi APi. The solution is designed to simplify EMV integration for web developers by using more agile software architecture, including JSON-based design and cloud-based infrastructure.

Industries
Due to the variety of available equipment and services, Transnational Payments works with merchants in a number of industries, including auto dealership, auto repair, business-to-business (B2B), education, entertainment and recreation, field services, fitness and spa, heating, ventilation and air conditioning (HVAC), insurance, medical, organizations and nonprofits, plumbing, professional services, religious organizations, restaurants and bars, retail, salons and beauty, veterinary and wholesale. It also provides merchant services in the firearms industry, known for having access to a limited selection of payment processors.

References

1999 establishments in Illinois
Credit cards in the United States
Financial services companies of the United States
Rosemont, Illinois